Nura Rupert is an Australian Aboriginal artist from north-west South Australia. She produces her works using intaglio methods of printmaking. The designs are drawn by etching and linocutting, and the prints are done on paper.

Nura was born in about 1933, in north-western South Australia. The place of her birth was Tjitapiti, which is northeast of Nyapaṟi, and close to what is now the outstation of Angatja. Nura was a "bush baby" (she was born in the bush), and her family lived a traditional, nomadic way of life in the desert around Angatja. Nura was a baby when her parents and elder brother settled at Ernabella, which was a Presbyterian mission at the time.

Nura worked in crafts from a young age. Growing up at the mission, she learned weaving and knitting to make rugs and clothes. She also learned to make artistic objects from wood carving and poker work. She began painting around 2000, producing acrylic paintings on canvases. She started using printmaking techniques a few years later.

Most of Nura's designs depict stories from her childhood. These are from traditional Pitjantjatjara stories told to children to make sure they stay away from trouble. Her style is often described as "child-like", because the shapes are very simple and look like a child's drawings.

Works by Nura have been featured in exhibitions since 2000, in many of Australia's major cities and also in cities in the United Kingdom. Her work is held in several major collections, including Flinders University, the Art Gallery of South Australia, the National Gallery of Australia, the National Museum of Australia, and Parliament House in Canberra. Prints by Nura were chosen as finalists for the National Aboriginal & Torres Strait Islander Art Awards in 2006 and 2007, and the Western Australian Indigenous Art Awards in 2010.

References 

1933 births
Living people
Australian printmakers
Pitjantjatjara people
Women printmakers
20th-century Australian women artists
20th-century Australian artists
21st-century Australian women artists
21st-century Australian artists
Australian Aboriginal artists